Seasons will Fall is a 2013 release by Circle II Circle. It was the band's sixth studio full-length release.

Track listing 
 "Diamond Blade" (Stevens/Stewart/Wentz) - 05:45
 "Without a Sound" (Craig Blackwell/Stevens/Stewart) - 03:56
 "Killing Death" (Stevens/Stewart) - 07:10
 "Epiphany" (Stevens/Stewart) - 05:13
 "End of Emotion" (Stevens/Stewart/Paul Stewart Jr.) - 08:59
 "Dreams That Never Die" (Stevens/Stewart) - 4:21
 "Seasons Will Fall" (Stevens/Stewart) - 05:21
 "Never Gonna Stop" (Stevens/Stewart) - 04:20
 "Isolation" (Stevens/Stewart) - 06:21
 "Sweet Despair" (Stevens/Stewart) - 05:35
 "Downshot" (Blackwell/Stevens) - 05:36
 "Only Yesterday" (Stevens/Stewart) - 04:58

Personnel 
 Zachary Stevens – lead vocals, keyboards
 Bill Hudson - guitars
 Christian David Wentz - guitars
 Paul Michael Stewart – bass guitar, keyboards
 Adam Sagan – drums
 Henning Wanner – Keyboards

Production 
 Craig Blackwell – executive producer
 Engineered by Christian Wentz and Craig Blackwell
 Mixed and mastered by Christian Wentz at Curios Kitty Studios, Oakland, CA
 Ron Keeler - assistant mixing engineer

External links 
 Official Circle II Circle website
  on Encyclopaedia Metallum

2013 albums
Circle II Circle albums